LeChee Rock is a  sandstone feature located south of Lake Powell, in Coconino County of northern Arizona. It can be seen from nearby Arizona State Route 98, or from as far away as Alstrom Point. LeChee (Łichíí) in Navajo language means red, referring to burgundy-colored leaves of a medicinal plant. The spelling for this geographical feature's name was officially adopted in 2004 by the U.S. Board on Geographic Names, prior to that it was officially Leche-e Rock.

Geology
LeChee Rock is located in the southern edge of the Great Basin Desert on the Colorado Plateau. It is composed of Romana Sandstone overlaying the Escalante Member of Entrada Sandstone, capped by the Salt Wash Member of the Morrison Formation. Beneath the sandstone, along the base of this feature, is reddish Carmel Formation which gives this feature its name.  All the strata are Jurassic in age. Precipitation runoff from this feature drains to Navajo and Antelope Canyons, then Lake Powell, all part of the Colorado River drainage basin.

Gallery

Climate
According to the Köppen climate classification system, LeChee Rock is located in an arid climate zone with hot, very dry summers, and chilly winters with very little snow. Spring and fall are the most favorable seasons to visit.

See also
 Colorado Plateau
 List of rock formations in the United States

References

External links

 Weather forecast: National Weather Service
 LeChee Rock pronunciation

Colorado Plateau
Landforms of Coconino County, Arizona
Geography of the Navajo Nation
North American 1000 m summits
Rock formations of Arizona